Where Do We Go from Here? is a Scottish comedy film directed by John McPhail and starring Tyler Collins, Lucy-Jane Quinlan, and Alison Peebles. The film centres on James, a young man who takes on the role of a janitor of a care home when his Grandad is forced into social care. It is the first feature to be directed by McPhail.

Plot
When Jen starts her new Job as a nurse at the 'Easy Love Care Home, she is surprised to find James, a 25-year-old man living and working in the building. James and his three, elderly best friends hatch a plan to go on one last adventure and the only medical cover they can get is the one person who doesn’t want to be around old people. Will their plan go off without a hitch or is there a sell by date on adventure?

Main cast
Tyler Collins as James
Lucy-Jane Quinlan as Jen
Alison Peebles as Joan
Richard Addison as Malcolm
Maryam Hamidi as Miss Thompson
Deirdre Murray as Nancy
Jim Sweeney as Jim

Release and reception
The film was released on 29 October 2015 and was screened at the Sydney Indie Film Festival where it was nominated for 7 awards. Unable to attend the awards ceremony, McPhail was represented by his sister in law who happened to be travelling around Australia at the time. The film went on win three awards at the festival including Best Score, Best Supporting Actress and Best Film. Speaking to the National Newspaper about the awards success, Director John McPhail said:

The film had its UK premiere at the 2016 edition of the Glasgow Film Festival. Speaking to the Sunday Herald about the films inclusion in the festival, McPhail said

Due to overwhelming demand for the film, the festival announced on Twitter that extra tickets would be released for the premiere screening at the Glasgow Film Theatre.

In 2016, actress Alison Peebles was nominated for the Best Supporting Actress at the 2016 BAFTA Scotland Film Awards.

Awards

References

External links
 
 Worrying Drake Productions

Scottish films
Films set in Scotland
Films shot in Scotland
2015 films
English-language Scottish films
British independent films
2015 comedy films
2015 directorial debut films
2010s English-language films
Films directed by John McPhail
2010s British films
2015 independent films